The 2017 Campeonato Pernambucano (officially the Pernambucano A1 2017) was the 103rd edition of the state championship of Pernambuco. The championship began on January 4 and ended on June 28. Twelve teams were competing, ten returning from the 2016 and two promoted from the 2016 Pernambucano A2 Championship (Flamengo de Arcoverde and Afogados).Santa Cruz were the defending champions, but were eliminated by Salgueiro in the semi-finals.
Sport defeated Salgueiro 2–1 on aggregate to win their 41st Campeonato Pernambucano title.

Teams
The teams in bold were qualified directly for the Second stage.

Notes

Format
In the first stage Afogados, América, Atlético Pernambucano, Belo Jardim, Central, Flamengo de Arcoverde, Salgueiro, Serra Talhada, and Vitória das Tabocas were drawn into three groups of three teams each, with each team playing once against the six clubs from the other two groups. After each team had played six matches, the top three teams qualified for the second stage. The six teams which finished fourth to ninth proceeded to the Relegation stage.
The Relegation stage group played a round-robin format. After the completion of the stage, the two clubs with the lowest number of points were relegated to the 2018 Campeonato Pernambucano A2.
Santa Cruz, Sport and Náutico were qualified directly for the second stage. The second stage group played a round-robin format. After the completion of the stage, the top four teams advanced to the Semi-finals.
Semi-finals and Finals were played on a home-and-away two-legged basis with the best placed team hosting the second leg.

Tiebreakers
The teams were ranked according to points (3 points for a win, 1 point for a draw, 0 points for a loss). If two or more teams were equal on points on completion of the group matches, the following criteria would be applied to determine the rankings:
Higher number of wins;
Superior goal difference;
Higher number of goals scored;
Head-to-head result between tied teams;
Fewest red cards received;
Fewest yellow cards received;
Draw in the headquarters of the Federação Pernambucana de Futebol.

First stage

Group A

Group B

Group C

First Stage Standings

Relegation stage

Second stage

Play-offs
In the Play-offs stages, each tie was played on a home-and-away two-legged basis. If tied on aggregate, away goals rule would not be used, extra time would not be played and penalty shoot-out would determine the winner. In the Third place matches and the Final, the second leg was hosted by the teams with a higher overall points.

Semi-finals

Semi-final 1

Salgueiro won 2–1 on aggregate and advanced to the Final.
Salgueiro qualifies to the 2018 Copa do Brasil and 2018 Copa do Nordeste.

Semi-final 2

Sport won 4–3 on aggregate and advanced to the Final.
Sport qualifies to the 2018 Copa do Brasil. They declined to participate in the 2018 Copa do Nordeste.

Third place matches

Host team

Matches

Santa Cruz won 3–2 on aggregate.
Santa Cruz qualifies to the 2018 Copa do Brasil and 2018 Copa do Nordeste.
Sport were replaced by Náutico in the 2018 Copa do Nordeste.

Final

Host team

Matches

Top goalscorers

References

Campeonato Pernambucano seasons
Pernambucano